Glanford Park is a football stadium in Scunthorpe, Lincolnshire, England, and is the current home of  team Scunthorpe United.

Opened in 1988 at a construction cost of £2.5 million, it was the first new purpose-built Football League stadium to be built in England for 33 years, since Southend United moved to Roots Hall in 1955.

The stadium is Scunthorpe's second ground, with the Iron having previously played at the Old Show Ground from 1899 to 1988. The ground's record attendance was set at 9,077 for a Football League Cup Third Round tie against Manchester United on 22 September 2010.

On 30 July 2019, the club signed a stadium naming-rights deal, and the stadium was renamed ‘The Sands Venue Stadium’ until the 2022/23 season, when Scunthorpe United chairman Peter Swann decided to change the stadium back to its former name ‘Glanford Park, as ‘The Sands Venue Stadium’ was ‘too long’ for supporters to say and that no Iron fan wanted the ground to be named that.

History
Scunthorpe United originally played at the Old Show Ground, which was located towards the centre of the town at the junction of Doncaster Road and Henderson Avenue. In the wake of the Bradford City disaster of 1985, it was determined that substantial improvements would have to be made to the Old Show Ground in order for it to meet new regulations, improvements which the club could not afford. Ultimately it was decided that the best course of action was to relocate to a new out of town site, with the sale of the land occupied by the Old Show Ground being used to raise much needed revenue for the club. After the club relocated, the Old Show Ground was demolished and replaced by a Safeway supermarket, which was subsequently sold to Sainsbury's in 2004.

Construction began during 1987 on a site located on the outskirts of Scunthorpe, close to the start of the M181 motorway and approximately 1.5 miles West of the Old Show Ground. The ground was fully completed prior to the commencement of the 1988–89 season and was officially opened at the start of the season by Princess Alexandra. Upon its completion, it was the first new Football League stadium in England for 33 years.

Glanford Park originally opened with a capacity of 11,190, both of the goal-ends being standing terraces, however this capacity was later reduced to its current value of 9,088 in 1991.

The name Glanford Park was derived from its funding by the then Glanford Borough Council, before North Lincolnshire became a unitary authority.

For all but one of its first 17 seasons (1999–2000), the stadium staged fourth tier football prior to Scunthorpe's promotion to League One in 2005, since when they have appeared in either League One or the Football League Championship for all but one season (2013–14).

Premier League side Manchester City visited Glanford Park on 24 January 2010, in the FA Cup Fourth Round. City won the match 4–2, which saw Robinho score his final goal in English football.

The record attendance is 9,077 for a 5–2 loss against Manchester United in the League Cup on 22 September 2010.

The record attendance for a Football League game stands at 8,921 for a 2–1 win over Newcastle United in the Championship, coming on 20 October 2009.

Structure and facilities

Glanford Park is a relatively simple affair, consisting of four single-tier stands of equal height, three of which are all seated. Although there is no seating in any of the four corners between stands the ground is still fully enclosed, with the rear wall and roof of each stand simply being extended to meet in the corners. Since February 2011, the south-west corner of the ground has been completely filled-in with the construction of the ‘Legends Lounge’, with the other three simply containing refreshment kiosks.

SPB Stand

The SPB stand (formerly the Scunthorpe Telegraph Stand) is the West side stand, and is the ground's main stand. It runs along the entire length of the pitch and is fully seated.

The two southernmost blocks of seating are marketed as the club's family area. To the rear of the stand are the club's various executive suites. These include a restaurant which is open throughout the week, a set of executive boxes, the Sir Ian Botham Executive Lounge and the Legends Lounge, which occupies the south-west corner. Members of the media are allocated a small area of seating at the rear of the stand, and a television gantry is also positioned within the roof space.

The players’ tunnel is located centrally within this stand, with the team dugouts being located on either side of the opening. The dressing rooms are naturally all located within this stand.

Other facilities located within this stand include the club's main offices, ticket office, club shop and sports injury clinic.

Britcon Stand

The name of this stand is the most frequently changing. It is much more commonly known as the "Doncaster Road End" among supporters, or even simpler, the "Donny Road End" or “DRE”. This stand is the only terraced stand at Glanford Park, and typically houses the more vocal supporters.

The club's popular bar, ‘The Iron Bar’ is located below this stand and is open on match days prior to kick-off and during half-time.

The Britcon Stand was due to be fitted with seating after the 2010–11 season due to Football League regulations that all standing areas must be made seating following three seasons in the Championship, however Scunthorpe United were subsequently relegated, reprieving the terrace for the time being.

Clugston Stand
The Clugston Stand (formerly the Grove Wharf Stand prior to the start of the 2012-13 season) is the East stand of the ground, and houses seated home supporters. Disabled seating is available at the front of  the stand in four allocated bays. The Clugston Stand now also features a can bar and a food outlet in the void beneath the seating with " Pukka Pies " a local favourite , which along with additional toilet facilities was installed at a cost of £100,000 in 2006.

The stadium's match day control room is located at the rear of this stand behind the seats with tea, coffee and refreshments available for anyone inside the control room. The control room spans a large space with a full non interrupted view of the pitch.

AMS Stand
The AMS Stand (also known as the South Stand or “Railway End”) houses away supporters, with a maximum capacity of 1,678. Extra away seating can be made available for away fans if required by sectioning off the corner of the Clugston Stand closest to the AMS Stand, however this is only usually done for games such as local derbies. A bar for visiting fans is positioned below this stand.

The AMS Stand was originally a terrace much the same as the Britcon Stand when the stadium was first built, however it was later decided that in the interests of safety that this end should be converted to seating only. This conversion was made during 1991, with the original blue seats being sourced from Aston Villa F.C. as a part of a deal involving the sale of defender Neil Cox to the West Midlands club. These seats were replaced with newer claret-coloured seats prior to the 2007–08 season.

International matches 
Glanford Park has hosted several international matches during its lifetime. The first international match to be played at the stadium came on 10 September 1991, with England U21 emerging as 2–1 victors against Germany U21. Since that date Glanford Park has played host to several England U19, England U17 and England U16 games, as well as a match between Portugal U17 and Australia U17 on 25 August 2010, in which Portugal ran out as 4–3 winners.

Future development
In the Scunthorpe Telegraph on 14 December 2006 it was announced that the club were looking to expand the Doncaster Road End of the stadium. Potential improvements mentioned included a second tier and expansion of the club's restaurant. In announcing the plan for expansion, the club's chairman Steven Wharton acknowledged that they were not currently filling the stadium to capacity on a regular basis, but added that he was preparing for a future situation where a larger capacity could be required, as the club were promotion contenders in League One that season, and finished the season being promoted as champions to reach the second tier of English football for the first time since the 1960s. This would have been the first major redevelopment of any stand at Glanford Park since its opening, however these plans were later shelved.

Under government regulations the club would have been required to convert the Doncaster Road End to seating if relegation from the Championship had been avoided in 2010–11. In an effort to overturn this ruling, supporters launched a Keep Scunthorpe Standing campaign. The club revealed revised expansion details in September 2010, with plans to add a three-level building behind the current terrace to include a larger supporters' bar, club shop and ticket office. The capacity of the ground would not have increased; this is due to the change from a terrace to a seating area. As it so happened, the Iron were relegated from the Championship at the end of the 2010–11 season and so these plans never came to fruition.

In January 2014, it was revealed that Scunthorpe United proposed a move to a brand new stadium, which could have seen Glanford Park closed and more than likely demolished within 30 years of being built. The projected cost of the project was £18 million and the new stadium was intended to have a capacity of 12,000. The new stadium was intended to integrate the stadium with 24/7 businesses, including a hotel, an office, training and catering facilities in order to maximize revenue for the club. It was further announced in July 2014 that the site of the new stadium was intended to form the focal point of the new 'Lincolnshire Lakes' development. The project was planned for commencement during 2015-2016. In October 2017, Scunthorpe United confirmed that the proposal to relocate to the new stadium had been dropped, stating a new aim to instead redevelop and extend Glanford Park, thus securing the immediate future of the stadium for the time being. In July 2019, the club confirmed planning permission to proceed with the redevelopment of Glanford Park. A new stadium will be constructed stand-by-stand on the current stadium site, with construction taking place over multiple seasons, allowing the club to continue playing without the need to relocate.

See also
List of English football stadia by capacity
Scunthorpe United F.C.

References

External links

Stadium pictures at StadiumDB.com
Football Ground Guide page

Scunthorpe United F.C.
Football venues in England
Sports venues in Scunthorpe
Sports venues completed in 1988
English Football League venues